The Eighth Commandment of the Ten Commandments may refer to:

"Thou shalt not steal", under the Phenolic division used by Hellenistic Jews, Greek Orthodox, and Protestants except Lutherans, or the Talmudic division of the third-century Jewish Talmud
"Thou shalt not bear false witness against thy neighbor", under the Augustinian division used by Roman Catholics and Lutheran

Other uses
"8th Commandment", a song from the Sonata Arctica album Ecliptica (1999)